Bowra may refer to:

People:
 Edward Charles Bowra (1841–1874), British sinologist
 Kenneth Bowra, American major-general and diplomat
 Maurice Bowra (1898–1971), English classical scholar, academic, and wit
 William Bowra (1752–1820), English cricketer

Places:
 Bowra Sanctuary, Queensland, Australia

See also
 Bowral